Chiranjeevulu is a 1956 Indian Telugu-language romantic drama film, produced by D. L. Narayana under Vinoda Productions banner and directed by Vedantam Raghavayya. It is a partial remake of the Hindi film Mela (1948). The film stars N. T. Rama Rao and Jamuna, with music composed by Ghantasala. It was released on 15 August 1956 and became a commercial success.

Plot 
Mohan and Sarada are neighbours who have been in love since childhood. Sarada's father Rayudu is a school teacher whereas Mohan's father Ramadasu is a sweet shop owner. Sarada's mother Govindamma is a shrew and her brother Ratnam does not relish the closeness of Mohan and Sarada. As his behaviour is mischievous, Govidamma sends Ratnam away and he returns after a few years. Once Sarada and Mohan visit the village fair where Krishna, a wise doctor, sees and likes Sarada. Spotting it, Ratnam gets acquainted with him. Meanwhile, elders decide to couple up Mohan and Sarada when Mohan moves to town to get jewellery for Sarada. On the way back, a thief hits him and steals the jewellery. Krishna, passing on the way, takes him to his hospital. Ratnam notices it and spoils the marriage by lying that Mohan has eloped with another girl. Subsequently, he fixes Sarada's marriage with Krishna. Knowing it, Mohan rushes towards the village when his bullock cart turns upside down and he becomes blind.

After learning that Sarada is married, a dejected Mohan attempts suicide but Krishna rescues and takes him to his home. Here Sarada sees Mohan, but does not reveal her identity and starts serving him. After some time, Mohan gets back his vision and returns to his village. Once Sarada talks to Mohan at the temple. Witnessing it, Ratnam starts blackmailing her. Once Mohan reaches Krishna's house to get back his doll when he realises Sarada is Krishna's wife. At present, Ratnam poisons Krishna's mind and he suspects his wife's fidelity. Grief-stricken, Mohan sits at the temple without food and water. Janaki, sister of Mohan, cannot tolerate it, so she brings out the truth before Krishna through Ratnam. By that time, Sarada consumes poison. Immediately, Krishna lifts her and drives, amidst the cyclonic night, to the garden where Mohan and Sarada spent their childhood. There, he allows Sarada to die in front of Mohan, who also succumbs to the shock.

Cast 
Adapted from The Hindu:

N. T. Rama Rao as Mohan
Jamuna as Sarada
Gummadi as Krishna
C. S. R. Anjaneyulu as Rayudu
B. Narasimha Rao as Ramadasu
Peketi Sivaram as Ratnam
Balakrishna as Satyam
Suryakantham as Akhilandamma
Chhaya Devi as Govindamma
Surabhi Balasaraswati as Janaki
Mahankali Venkayya
Allu Ramalingam

Production 
Chiranjeevulu was directed by Vedantam Raghavayya and produced by D. L. Narayana under Vinoda Productions. It was remade from the Hindi film Mela (1948), but Raghavayya, Narayana and dialogue writer Malladi Ramakrishna Sastry made substantial changes to the screenplay, one of them being the male lead going blind which did not happen in the Hindi original. While the female lead in Mela is unable to marry the male lead and instead forced to marry a much older widower who has children, the female lead in Chiranjeevulu marries a "young eligible bachelor". N. T. Rama Rao was chosen to play the male lead Mohan, reprising the role originally played by Dilip Kumar. He wore contact lenses to portray his character when blind. The scene where a blind Mohan attempts suicide by walking into the way of an incoming train and is saved by the doctor Krishna was shot at Chengalpattu junction railway station. While filming this scene, Gummadi, who played Krishna, fell but managed to get up and to push an oblivious Rama Rao out of the train's way. It was not written in the script that Krishna had to fall, but the filmed scene was retained. Jamuna played the female Sarada, portrayed by Nargis in Mela where the character was known as Manju. Chiranjeevulu was her first film with Raghavayya, who would frequently help correct her acting over the course of the film's production. Cinematography was handled by V. N. Reddy, and the editing by R. Hanumantha Rao. Principal photography took place primarily at Revathy Studios, Madras.

Soundtrack 
The soundtrack was composed by Ghantasala, and the lyrics were written by Malladi Ramakrishna Sastry. The songs "Thellavaaraga Vachhe", "Kanupaapa Karuvaina Kanulenduko" and "Yendaka Yendaka" attained popularity.

Release and reception 
Chiranjeevulu was released on 15 August 1956 and became a commercial success. The film was dubbed in Tamil as Amarageetham.

References

External links 
 

1956 films
1956 romantic drama films
Films directed by Vedantam Raghavayya
Films scored by Ghantasala (musician)
Indian romantic drama films
Telugu remakes of Hindi films
Indian black-and-white films